Arif Mirzoýew (born January 13, 1980) is a professional Turkmen football player, currently playing for FC Altyn Asyr.

International career statistics

Goals for Senior National Team

References

Living people
1980 births
Turkmenistan footballers
Turkmenistan expatriate footballers
Turkmenistan international footballers
2004 AFC Asian Cup players
Sportspeople from Ashgabat
Footballers at the 2002 Asian Games
Association football forwards
Asian Games competitors for Turkmenistan
Expatriate footballers in Azerbaijan
Expatriate footballers in Uzbekistan
Turkmenistan expatriate sportspeople in Azerbaijan
Turkmenistan expatriate sportspeople in Uzbekistan
Neftçi PFK players
FC Aşgabat players
navbahor Namangan players
Qarabağ FK players
FC Nisa Aşgabat players
FK Dinamo Samarqand players